Logan Township is a township in Butler County, Kansas, USA.  As of the 2000 census, its population was 154.

Logan Township was organized in 1874.

Geography

The streams of Eagle Creek and Plum Creek run through this township.

Further reading

References

 USGS Geographic Names Information System (GNIS)

External links
 City-Data.com

Townships in Butler County, Kansas
Townships in Kansas